The following highways are numbered 216:

Canada
 Alberta Highway 216
 Manitoba Provincial Road 216
 Prince Edward Island Route 216
 Quebec Route 216
 Nova Scotia Route 216

China
 China National Highway 216

Costa Rica
 National Route 216

India
 National Highway 216 (India)

United States
 U.S. Route 216 (former)
 Alabama State Route 216
 California State Route 216
 Connecticut Route 216
 Florida State Road 216 (former)
 Georgia State Route 216
 K-216 (Kansas highway)
Kentucky Route 216
 Maine State Route 216
 Maryland Route 216
 M-216 (Michigan highway)
Minnesota State Highway 216 (former)
 Montana Secondary Highway 216 (former)
 New Mexico State Road 216
 New York State Route 216
 North Carolina Highway 216
 Ohio State Route 216
 Oregon Route 216
 Pennsylvania Route 216
 Rhode Island Route 216
 South Carolina Highway 216
 Tennessee State Route 216
 Texas State Highway 216 (former)
 Texas State Highway Loop 216 (former)
 Texas State Highway Spur 216
 Utah State Route 216 (former)
 Virginia State Route 216
 Wyoming Highway 216